Sami Hasan Saleh Al Hadi Al Nash (2 May 1957 – 10 May 2021) was a Yemeni professional football manager.

Career
Since January until May 2009 he coached the Yemen national team. Later, since January until October 2012 he again worked as manager of the Yemen team. In March 2013 he became a head coach of the Al-Ahli Ta'izz. Also since April until December 2013 he led the Yemen team.

In 2019, he was once again appointed coach of Yemen in preparation for the 2019 WAFF Championship replacing Ján Kocian.

Death
On 16 May 2021, the Yemen Football Association announced Al Nash had died from COVID-19 on 10 May 2021, in the Yemeni port city of Aden after contracting the virus in April during a training camp in Shabwah.

Managerial statistics

References

External links

Profile at Soccerpunter.com

1957 births
2021 deaths
Yemeni football managers
Yemen national football team managers
Place of birth missing
Deaths from the COVID-19 pandemic in Yemen